Takamaka Rum is a brand of rum that is distilled, aged and blended in the Seychelles, at the Trois Frères Distillery, on the main island of Mahé.  The distillery has been operating since 2002, and was founded by the d’Offay brothers, Richard and Bernard d’Offay. It is the first and only commercial rum producer and exporter in the Seychelles.

History
Rum was first introduced to the Seychelles in the mid 16th century by the British Navy. Sugar cane cultivation on the islands began in the late 1800s and early 1900s, primarily to supplement the supply of sugar from infrequent visits from ships. As the delivery of sugar to the islands became more frequent, the use of sugar cane began to evolve - initially to making fermented cane juice known as 'Baka'.

Local residents also have a history of making their own rhum arrangé, a mixture of local rum and a blend of herbs and spices (usually a family recipe). This is traditionally served as a digestif (post-meal drink). 

The Trois Frères Distillery was founded in 2002 and is located on an old tropical spice plantation site, La Plaine St André, which dates back to the 1700s. The d'Offay family was granted a lease for the property, which is a national heritage site, and restored it over a period of two and half years to set up the distillery.

The name Takamaka refers to a local bay on the island and is the name of a tree which featured on the early labels of the rum. The Takamaka brand is now exported internationally to markets in Europe and the United Arab Emirates.

Production process
Takamaka Rum is made from naturally grown local sugar cane from four different regions of Mahé by a cooperative of three dozen local farmers. It is then crushed on site at the distillery. The sugar cane juice is fermented and distilled in temperature controlled stainless steel tanks. The distillation process takes place in three copper stills, two pot stills for flavour and a rectifying column for purity. Takamaka Rums are then aged and matured in French and American oak barrels before being blended with aged rums, local spices, fruit extracts, and spring water from the island.

Varieties
St. André – Premium rum, aged for 8 years in American oak. 100CL/40%
 Dark Spiced Rum – The flagship Takamaka rum. A blend of rums and local spices. 70CL/38%

Extra Noir – A blend of rums aged in bourbon & French oak barrels. 70CL/43%
 White Rum – White rum distilled to an ABV of 96% blended with island spring water. 70CL/43%
 White Overproof 69 Rum – Much higher than the standard 40% ABV, Takamaka 69 has an ABV of 69% and is best used in mixed drinks. 70CL/69%
 Coconut Rum – A white rum blended with pure coconut extract. 70CL/25%
 Pineapple Rum – A white rum blended with pineapple extract. 70CL/25%
 Mango and Passion Rum – A white rum blended with mango and passion fruit. 70CL/25%

References 

 
 
 
 
 
 

Alcoholic drink brands